Sachsia may refer to:
Sachsia (fungus) , a genus of fungi in the Ascomycota phylum
Sachsia (nematode) , a genus of nematodes in the Diplogasteridae family
Sachsia (plant) , a genus of plants in the family Asteraceae